The year 2003 is the second year in the history of Cage Warriors, a mixed martial arts promotion based in the United Kingdom. In 2003 Cage Rage Championships held 3 events beginning with, CWFC 3: Cage Warriors 3.

Events list

CWFC 3: Cage Warriors 3

CWFC 3: Cage Warriors 3 was an event held on March 16, 2003 in Southampton, England.

Results

CWFC 4: UK vs. France

CWFC 4: UK vs. France was an event held on July 27, 2003 in Southampton, England.

Results

CWFC 5: Cage Warriors 5

CWFC 5: Cage Warriors 5 was an event held on November 2, 2003 in Portsmouth, England.

Results

See also 
 Cage Warriors

References

Cage Warriors events
2003 in mixed martial arts